The 2016–17 Cupa României was the seventy-ninth season of the annual Romanian primary football knockout tournament. The winner, Voluntari should qualify for the third qualifying round of the 2017–18 UEFA Europa League, but failed to obtain UEFA licence.

Participating clubs
The following 155 teams qualified for the competition:

Preliminary rounds

The first rounds, and any preliminaries, are organised by the Regional Leagues.

First round
All matches were played on 10 August 2016.

|colspan="3" style="background-color:#97DEFF"|10 August 2016

|}

Second round
All matches were played on 24 August 2016.

|colspan="3" style="background-color:#97DEFF"|24 August 2016

|}

Third round
All matches were played on 13 and 14 September 2016.

|colspan="3" style="background-color:#97DEFF"|13 September 2016

|-
|colspan="3" style="background-color:#97DEFF"|14 September 2016

|}

Fourth round
The matches were to be played on 4, 5 and 6 October 2016.

|colspan="3" style="background-color:#97DEFF"|4 October 2016

|-
|colspan="3" style="background-color:#97DEFF"|5 October 2016

|-
|colspan="3" style="background-color:#97DEFF"|6 October 2016

|}

Round of 32
The matches were played on 25, 26 and 27 October 2016.

Round of 16
The matches were played on 13, 14 and 15 December 2016.

Quarter-finals
The matches were played on 28, 29, and 30 March 2017.

Semi-finals
The semi-final matches are played in a round-trip system. The first legs were played on 25 and 27 April 2017 and the return legs will be played on 17 and 18 May 2017.

|}

1st leg

2nd leg

Final

References

 
Romania
Cupa României seasons